Sead Gorani (born 17 January 1977) is a Kosovar footballer who played in clubs from FR Yugoslavia, Turkey, Bulgaria, Macedonia and Kosovo. After retiring, he became in charge, along his father, of a football school Winner in his hometown Prizren.

Club career
Born in Prizren, Socialist Autonomous Province of Kosovo, SR Serbia, SFR Yugoslavia (modern Kosovo), Gorani started playing in local club Liria Prizren at age of 9, and he spent his entire youth career there.  He then moved abroad and played one season as left-winger with Zeytinburnuspor, playing at time in the Turkish Süper Lig. At age of 18 he, returned to FR Yugoslavia, and signed with Montenegrin side FK Ibar Rožaje playing back then in the Second League of FR Yugoslavia.

In summer 1998, coming from FK Ibar, he moved to Serbian and Yugoslav capital Belgrade and joined FK Železnik.  He played with Železnik in the 1999–2000 First League of FR Yugoslavia making four appearances and in the 2000–01 First League of FR Yugoslavia making one appearance.

After a spell with Bulgarian side PFC Naftex Burgas, he played with FK Pobeda in the 2003–04 Macedonian First Football League becoming Macedonian champion, and later, with Kosovar side KF Liria in the season 2005–06.

Personal life
Sead Gorani is son of former football player and coach Šukrija Gorani, and along his father, Sead has been in charge of football school Winner in Prizren since 2006. By 2011, Sead had been retired from his playing career three years earlier as result of a cirgury he had to be submitted to, and has been coaching the youth teams at Winner five years already. On 21 June 2013, representatives of KF Liria and three local football schools, one of them being Sead Gorani representing Winner, met with representatives of the Commission for Culture, Youth and Sports in order to improve the investments in football in the city of Prizren.

Honours
Pobeda
Macedonian First League: 2003–04

Liria
Kosovo Cup: 2007

References

1977 births
Living people
People from Prizren
Kosovan footballers
Association football midfielders
KF Liria players
Zeytinburnuspor footballers
FK Ibar Rožaje players
FK Železnik players
PFC Naftex Burgas players
FK Pobeda players
First League of Serbia and Montenegro players
Kosovan expatriate footballers
Expatriate footballers in Turkey
Kosovan expatriate sportspeople in Turkey
Expatriate footballers in Bulgaria
Kosovan expatriate sportspeople in Bulgaria
Expatriate footballers in North Macedonia
Kosovan expatriate sportspeople in North Macedonia